The Brussels Tram Museum, officially Musée du Transport Urbain Bruxellois (French) or Museum voor het Stedelijk Vervoer te Brussel (Dutch), is a transport museum located in an old tram depot in the municipality of Woluwe-Saint-Pierre, Brussels, Belgium. It displays a collection of trams and buses from different eras in the history of public transport in Brussels.

The museum is situated on the Avenue de Tervueren 364b opposite Woluwe Park.

References

External links

 

Museums in Brussels
Tram museums